Maasilinn Castle is located in Maasi village in Orissaare Parish, Saare County, Estonia. It served as the centre of Eastern Saaremaa and Muhu in Medieval times.

History
It was established in 1345 by Livonian Order' Landmeister Burchard von Dreileben after the St. George's Night Uprising was quelled. It was meant to replace the former seat of the local vogt in Pöide Castle, which had been destroyed by the Oeselians. The first castle was built from wood and was reconstructed from stone. The castle was destroyed twice in the Livonian War. It remained in ruins thereafter.

See also
 History of Estonia
 List of castles in Estonia

External links

References 

Saaremaa Parish
Castles of the Teutonic Knights
Buildings and structures in Saaremaa
Tourist attractions in Saare County